The Karamanids ( or ), also known as the Emirate of Karaman and Beylik of Karaman, was one of the Anatolian beyliks, centered in South-Central Anatolia around the present-day Karaman Province. From the middle 1300s until its fall in 1487, the Karamanid dynasty was one of the most powerful beyliks in Anatolia.

History
The Karamanids traced their ancestry from Hodja Sad al-Din and his son Nure Sufi Bey, who emigrated from Arran (roughly encompassing modern-day Azerbaijan) to Sivas because of the Mongol invasion in 1230.

The Karamanids were members of the Salur tribe of Oghuz Turks. According to Muhsin Yazıcıoğlu and others, they were members of the Afshar tribe, which participated in the revolt led by Baba Ishak and afterwards moved to the western Taurus Mountains, near the town of Larende, where they came to serve the Seljuks. Nure Sofi worked there as a woodcutter. His son, Kerîmeddin Karaman Bey, gained a tenuous control over the mountainous parts of Cilicia in the middle of the 13th century. A persistent but spurious legend, however, claims that the Seljuq Sultan of Rum, Kayqubad I, instead established a Karamanid dynasty in these lands.

Karaman Bey expanded his territories by capturing castles in Ermenek, Mut, Ereğli, Gülnar, and Silifke. The year of the conquests is reported as 1225, during the reign of Ala al-Din Kaykubadh I (1220–1237), which seems excessively early. Karaman Bey's conquests were mainly at the expense of the Kingdom of Lesser Armenia (and perhaps at the expense of Rukn al-Din Kilij Arslan IV, 1248–1265); in any case it is certain that he fought against the Kingdom of Lesser Armenia (and probably even died in this fight) to such extent that King Hethum I (1226–1269) had to place himself voluntarily under the sovereignty of the great Khan, in order to protect his kingdom from Mamluks and Seljuks (1244).

The rivalry between Kilij Arslan IV and Izz al-Din Kaykaus II allowed the tribes in the border areas to live virtually independently. Karaman Bey helped Kaykus, but Arslan had the support of both the Mongols and Pervâne Sulayman Muin al-Din (who had the real power in the sultanate).

The Mongolian governor and general Baiju was dismissed from office in 1256 because he had failed to conquer new territories, but he continued to serve as a general and appeared, the same year, fighting the Sultan of Rum, who had not paid the tax, and he managed to defeat the sultan a second time. Rukn al-Din Kilidj Arslan IV got rid of almost all hostile begs and amirs except Karaman Bey, to whom he gave the town of Larende (now Karaman, in honor of the dynasty) and Ermenek (c. 1260) in order to win him to his side. In the meantime, Bunsuz, brother of Karaman Bey, was chosen as a Candar, or bodyguard, for Kilij Arslan IV. Their power rose as a result of the unification of Turkish clans that lived in the mountainous regions of Cilicia with the new Turkish population transferred there by Kayqubad.

Good relations between the Seljuqs and the Karamanids did not last. In 1261, on the pretext of supporting Kaykaus II, who had fled to Constantinople as a result of the intrigues of the chancellor Mu'in al-Din Suleyman, the Pervane, Karaman Bey and his two brothers, Zeynül-Hac and Bunsuz, marched toward Konya, the Seljuq capital, with 20,000 men. A combined Seljuq and Mongol army, led by the Pervane, defeated the Karamanid army and captured Karaman Bey's two brothers.

After Karaman Bey died in 1262, his older son, Mehmet I of Karaman, became the head of the house. He immediately negotiated alliances with other Turkmen clans to raise an army against the Seljuqs and Ilkhanids. During the 1276 revolt of Hatıroğlu Şemseddin Bey against Mongol domination in Anatolia, Karamanids also defeated several Mongol-Seljuq armies. In the Battle of Göksu in 1277 in particular, the central power of the Seljuq was dealt a severe blow. Taking advantage of the general confusion, Mehmed Bey captured Konya on 12 May and placed on the throne a pretender called Jimri, who claimed to be the son of Kaykaus. In the end, however, Mehmed was defeated by Seljuq and Mongol forces and executed with some of his brothers in 1278.

Despite these blows, the Karamanids continued to increase their power and influence, largely aided by the Mamluks of Egypt, especially during the reign of Baybars. Karamanids captured Konya on two more occasions in the beginning of the 14th century, but were driven out the first time by emir Chupan, the Ilkhanid governor of Anatolia, and the second time by Chupan's son and successor Timurtash. An expansion of Karamanoğlu power occurred after the fall of the Ilkhanids. A second expansion coincided with Karamanoğlu Alâeddin Ali Bey's marriage to Nefise Hatun, the daughter of the Ottoman sultan Murat I, the first important contact between the two dynasties.

As Ottoman power expanded into the Balkans, Aleaddin Ali Bey captured the city of Beyşehir, which had been an Ottoman city. However, it did not take much time for the Ottomans to react and march on Konya, the Karamanoğlu capital city. A treaty between the two kingdoms was formed, and peace existed until the reign of Bayezid I.

Timur gave control of the Karamanid lands to Mehmet Bey, the oldest son of Aleaddin Ali Bey. After Bayezid I died in 1403, the Ottoman Empire went into a political crisis as the Ottoman family fell prey to internecine strife. It was an opportunity not only for Karamanids but also for all of the Anatolian beyliks. Mehmet Bey assembled an army to march on Bursa. He captured the city and damaged it; this would not be the last Karamanid invasion of Ottoman lands. However, Mehmet Bey was captured by Bayezid Pasha and sent to prison. He apologized for what he had done and was forgiven by the Ottoman ruler.

Ramazanoğlu Ali Bey captured Tarsus while Mehmet Bey was in prison. Mustafa Bey, son of Mehmet Bey, retook the city during a conflict between the Emirs of Sham and Egypt. After that, the Egyptian sultan Sayf ad-Din Inal sent an army to retake Tarsus from the Karamanids. The Egyptian Mamluks damaged Konya after defeating the Karamanids, and Mehmet Bey retreated from Konya. Ramazanoğlu Ali Bey pursued and captured him; according to an agreement between the two leaders, Mehmet Bey was exiled to Egypt for the rest of his life.

During the Crusade of Varna against the Ottomans in 1443–44, Karamanid İbrahim Bey marched on Ankara and Kütahya, destroying both cities. In the meantime, the Ottoman sultan Murad II was returning from Rumelia with a victory against the Hungarian Crusaders. Like all other Islamic emirates in Anatolia, the Karamanids were accused of treason. Hence, İbrahim Bey accepted all Ottoman terms. The Karamanid state was eventually terminated by the Ottomans in 1487, as the power of their Mameluke allies was declining. To never again gather and threaten the integrity of the Empire, they killed a large part of the population and displaced the entire population to the last man. Some were resettled in various parts of Anatolia. Large groups were accommodated in northern Iran on the territory of present-day Azerbaijan. The main part was brought to the newly conquered territories in north-eastern Bulgaria – the Ludogorie region, another group – to what is now northern Greece and southern Bulgaria— present-day Kardzhali region and Macedonia. Ottomans founded Karaman Eyalet from former territories of Karamanids.

Flag
According to Abraham Cresques' Catalan Atlas (compiled in 1375), the flag of Karamanoğlu consisted of a blue six-edged star. In the medieval times, this star was a popular Islamic symbol (especially among the Hanafi Madhhab) known as the Seal of Solomon due to the belief that the Jewish king, King Solomon was a prophet, and was used by several of the Anatolian beyliks (such as the Isfendiyarids). As such the seal was also used by Ottomans in their mosque decorations, coins and even in the personal flags of individual Pasha (e.g. that of Hayreddin Barbarossa). It adorned the tombs of several early Islamic figures in Medina until the destruction of al-Baqi cemetery. Al-Buni and Ibn Arabi consider the seal to represent the Greatest Name, and its use remains common in contemporary Muslim esoteric circles.

Power of the Karamanid state in Anatolia
According to Mesâlik-ül-Ebsâr, written by Şehâbeddin Ömer, the Karamanid army had 25,000 riders and 25,000 saracens. They could also rely on some Turkmen tribes and their warriors.

Their economic activities depended mostly on control of strategic commercial areas such as Konya, Karaman and the ports of Lamos, Silifke, Anamur, and Manavgat.

Karamanid architecture

66 mosques, 8 hammams, 2 caravanserais and 3 medreses built by the Karamanids survived to the present day. Notable examples of Karamanid architecture include:
 Hasbey Medrese (1241)
 Şerafettin Mosque (13th century)
 İnce Minare (Dar-ül Hadis) Medrese (1258–1279)
 Hatuniye Medrese (Karaman)
 Mevlana Mosque and Tomb in Konya
 Mader-i Mevlana (Aktekke) mosque in Karaman
 Ibrahim Bey Mosque (Imaret) in Karaman

List of rulers
 Nûreddin Sûfi Bey (Capital City: Ereğli) (1250–1256)
 Kerîmeddin Karaman Bey (Capital City: Ermenek) (1256?-1261)
 Şemseddin I. Mehmed Bey (1261–1277), notable for making Turkish the official language
 Güneri Bey (1277–1300)
 Bedreddin Mahmut Bey (1300–1308)
 Yahşı Han Bey (1308–1312) (Capital City: Konya)
 Bedreddin I. İbrahim Bey (1312–1333, 1348–1349)
 Alâeddin Halil Mirza Bey (1333–1348)
 Fahreddin Ahmed Bey (1349–1350)
 Şemseddin Bey (1350–1351)
 Hacı Sûfi Burhâneddin Musa Bey (Capital City: Mut) (1351–1356)
 Seyfeddin Süleyman Bey (1357–1361)
 Damad I. Alâeddin Ali Bey (1361–1398)
 Sultanzâde II. Mehmed Bey (1398–1399, 1402–1420, 1421–1423)
 Damad Bengi Ali Bey (1423–1424)
 Damad II. İbrahim Bey (1424–1464)
 Sultanzâde İshak Bey (1464)
 Sultanzâde Pîr Ahmed Bey (1464–1469)
 Kasım Bey (1469–1483)
 Turgutoğlu Mahmud Bey (1483–1487)

See also
 Karamanlides
 Karaman
 Karaman Province
 Anatolian Turkish Beyliks
 List of Sunni Muslim dynasties
 Caramania

Notes

References

Sources

Further reading
 

 
Anatolian beyliks
1487 disestablishments
States and territories established in 1250
States and territories established in 1277
History of Adana Province
History of Aksaray Province
History of Antalya Province
History of Karaman Province
History of Kayseri Province
History of Kırşehir Province
History of Konya Province
History of Mersin Province
History of Nevşehir Province
History of Niğde Province
History of Osmaniye Province
History of Konya
Former empires in Asia